Swati Khandoker is an Indian politician. She was elected to the West Bengal Legislative Assembly from Chanditala as a member of the All India Trinamool Congress.

References

Living people
West Bengal MLAs 2021–2026
Year of birth missing (living people)
Trinamool Congress politicians from West Bengal
21st-century Indian politicians
21st-century Indian women politicians
West Bengal politicians